Macrogrammus is an extinct genus from a well-known class of fossil marine arthropods, the trilobites. It lived during the early part of the Arenig stage of the Ordovician Period, a faunal stage which lasted from approximately 478 to 471 million years ago. Its fossil name is Macrogrammus scylfense Whittard named after its British Collector WF Whittard in 1966.

References

Pilekiidae
Phacopida genera
Ordovician trilobites of South America
Ordovician trilobites of Europe